Eumorphia is a genus of African flowering plants in the daisy family. It has white flowers.

 Species
 Eumorphia corymbosa E.Phillips - Cape Provinces
 Eumorphia davyi Bolus - Mpumalanga, Limpopo
 Eumorphia dregeana DC. - Cape Provinces, Free State
 Eumorphia prostrata Bolus - Cape Provinces, Lesotho, KwaZulu-Natal
 Eumorphia sericea J.M.Wood & M.S.Evans	- Cape Provinces, Free State, Lesotho, KwaZulu-Natal
 Eumorphia swaziensis Compton - Eswatini, Mpumalanga, Limpopo

References

Flora of Southern Africa
Asteraceae genera
Anthemideae